Dr. Bhim Sen Singhal (also known as Dr. B. S. Singhal) is the Director of Neurology at Bombay Hospital Institute of Medical Sciences in Mumbai, India.

Early life and education

Singhal was born at Mount Abu on 23 January 1933. After schooling at Mount Abu and   premedical studies at Maharaja's College in Jaipur, he studied medicine at the   Grant Medical College and Sir J. J. Group of Hospitals in Mumbai. He obtained his MBBS degree in 1956 and MD in 1959. After his initial training in Neurology in Mumbai, he went abroad for further training at the UCL Institute of Neurology, London. During his training in the United Kingdom, he obtained his MRCP (Edinburgh) in 1960 and MRCP (London) in 1961. He was made a Fellow of the Royal College of Edinburgh in 1973 and Fellow of the Royal College of London in 1985.

Professional life 

On his return to India in 1962, Dr. B. S. Singhal joined the departments of Neurology at Grant Medical College and Sir J. J. Group of Hospitals and at Bombay Hospital Institute of Medical Sciences. He retired as Professor & Head of Neurology from Grant Medical College in 1991. Currently, he is Director of Neurology at Bombay Hospital.

Over the course of his professional life, Dr. B. S. Singhal has helped to train over 200 neurologists who are now providing care across India. He has published over 200 scientific papers in both national and international books and journals. He is known for his interest and work in multiple sclerosis and myasthenia gravis. With international collaboration and help from his colleagues, he discovered the entity of Megalencephalic Leukodystrophy with a specific gene defect prevalent in the Agarwal community.

Throughout his entire career, Dr. B. S. Singhal has been actively promoting the cause of Neurology. He was President of the Neurological Society of India (1986), President of the Indian Epilepsy Association (2000-2002), member of the World Health Organization working group for multiple sclerosis and Parkinson's disease, Regional Director for the World Federation of Neurology (2005-2009), and Chairperson of the Asian Section of The Movement Disorder Society (2009-2010). In order to update neurologists on recent advances in neurology, Dr. Singhal created the 'Neurology Foundation' in 1996, and holds 'Neurology Update' meetings every alternate year.

Dr. Singhal established the Parkinson's Disease and Movement Disorder Society  in 2001 which now has 19 support groups in Mumbai and also in Nasik, Goa, Pune, Jalgaon, Hyderabad, Surat, Jodhpur, and Cochin, where he now serves as Honorary Secretary. This has been acknowledged as a model for developing countries by organizations like the World Parkinson's Congress and the World Federation of Neurology.

Dr. Singhal has been honored nationally and internationally by having two orations instituted in his name. The first 'Singhal Oration' is delivered every alternate year at the annual meeting of the Indian Academy of Neurology. The second 'Singhal Oration' is delivered at the international conference of the World Federation of Neurology. In 2022, the Government of India recognized Dr. Singhal's years of service with the prestigious Padma Shri award.

Awards 

Dr. B.S. Singhal has received the following awards for his contributions to the field of Neurology.

 1983 - Karmayogi Puraskar Award
 1983 - Fellowship of the National Academy of Medical Sciences,
 1993 - Rajasthan Ratna Award
 1999 - Dr. B. C. Roy National Award
 2004 - Priyadarshini Academy National Award
 2005 - Wockhardt Award
 2006 - Lifetime Achievement Award of Madras Neuro Trust.
 2009 - Dhanvantari Award
 2013 - Rameshwardas Birla National Award
 2022 - Padma Shri National Award for services in the field of Medicine

References 

Living people
1933 births
Indian neurologists
Fellows of the National Academy of Medical Sciences
Dr. B. C. Roy Award winners
Medical doctors from Rajasthan
20th-century Indian medical doctors